Kerala State Electronics Development Corporation Limited (KELTRON) is an electronic enterprise situated in Trivandrum, Kerala, India. It was founded in 1973 by K. P. P. Nambiar.

Location 

Units of KELTRON are in the following cities of India:
 Thiruvananthapuram (corporate head office and factory), Kerala
 New Delhi
 Kannur
 Kochi
 Bangalore (Karnataka)
 Ahmedabad, (Gujarat)
 Mumbai

 Kolkata
 Chennai, Tamil Nadu
Thrissur

Keltron Knowledge Centres 

Keltron has also started Knowledge Centres as an initiative to support youth to develop skills in fields like IT, ITeS and Computer Education.

References

Companies based in Thiruvananthapuram
1973 establishments in Kerala
Indian companies established in 1973
Electronics companies of India
Electronics companies established in 1973
Government-owned companies of Kerala